Iran (officially the Islamic Republic of Iran) competed at the 2012 Summer Olympics in London, from 27 July to 12 August 2012. The nation has competed at every Summer Olympic games since its official debut in 1948 with the exception of the 1980 and 1984 Summer Olympics. The National Olympic Committee of the Islamic Republic of Iran sent the nation's second-largest delegation to the Games, one less than it sent to Beijing. A total of 53 athletes, 45 men and 8 women, competed in 14 sports. This was also the youngest delegation in Iran's Olympic history, with half the team under the age of 25, and many of them are expected to reach their peak in time for the 2016 Summer Olympics in Rio de Janeiro. Heavyweight boxer Ali Mazaheri was the nation's flag bearer at the opening ceremony.

Iran left London with a total of 13 medals (7 gold, 5 silver, and 1 bronze), finishing twelfth in the overall medal standings. This was also the most successful Olympics for the Middle East, winning the largest number of medals at a single games, and surpassing by just double the record from Athens. Notable accomplishments included the nation's first gold medals in men's Greco-Roman wrestling, and the nation's first medal in athletics, won by discus thrower Ehsan Haddadi.

Medalists

| width="78%" align="left" valign="top" |

| width="22%" align="left" valign="top" |

Competitors

Archery

Two Iranian archers (one man and one woman) qualified for the London Olympics.

Athletics

Iranian athletes have so far achieved qualifying standards in the following athletics events (up to a maximum of 3 athletes in each event at the 'A' Standard, and 1 at the 'B' Standard):

Men
Track & road events

Field events

Women
Field events

Boxing

Iran has so far qualified boxers for the following events.

Men

Canoeing

Sprint
Iran has qualified boats for the following events

Qualification Legend: FA = Qualify to final (medal); FB = Qualify to final B (non-medal)

Cycling

Road

Fencing

Men

Judo

Rowing

Iran has qualified for the following boats. 

Men

Women

Qualification Legend: FA=Final A (medal); FB=Final B (non-medal); FC=Final C (non-medal); FD=Final D (non-medal); FE=Final E (non-medal); FF=Final F (non-medal); SA/B=Semifinals A/B; SC/D=Semifinals C/D; SE/F=Semifinals E/F; QF=Quarterfinals; R=Repechage

Shooting

Iran has qualified three quota places in the shooting events;

Men

Women

Swimming

Iran has selected one swimmer under the Universality rule.

Men

Table tennis

Iran has qualified 2 athletes.

Taekwondo

Iran has qualified two men and one woman.

Weightlifting

Iran has qualified 6 men.

Wrestling

Iran has qualified 13 quota places.

Men's freestyle

Men's Greco-Roman

References

External links
 National Olympic committee of Iran
 London 2012 official website 

Nations at the 2012 Summer Olympics
2012
2012 in Iranian sport